The Turing Talk, previously known as the Turing Lecture, is an annual award lecture delivered by a noted speaker on the subject of Computer Science. Sponsored and co-hosted by the Institution of Engineering and Technology (IET) and the British Computer Society, the talk has been delivered at different locations in the United Kingdom annually since 1999. Venues for the talk have included Savoy Place, the Royal Institution in  London, Cardiff University, The University of Manchester, Belfast City Hall and the University of Glasgow. The main talk is preluded with an insight speaker, who performs an opening act to the main event.

The talk is named in honour of Alan Turing and should not be confused with the Turing Award lecture organised by the Association for Computing Machinery (ACM). Recent Turing talks are available as a live webcast and archived online.

Turing Talks
Previous speakers have included:
 2022: Julie McCann, a day in the life of a smart city
 2021: Cecilia Mascolo, Sounding out wearable and audio data for health diagnostics
 2020: , Digital Twins: The Next Phase of the AI Revolution
 2019:  Engineering a fair future: Why we need to train unbiased AI
 2018: Andy Harter, Innovation and technology – art or science?
 2017: Guruduth Banavar, Beneficial AI for the Advancement of Humankind
 2016: Robert Schukai, The Internet of Me: It's all about my screens
 2015: Robert Pepper, The Internet Paradox: How bottom-up beat(s) command and control
 2014: Bernard S. Meyerson, Beyond silicon: Cognition and much, much more
 2013: Suranga Chandratillake, What they didn't teach me: building a technology company and taking it to market
 2012: Ray Dolan, From cryptoanalysis to cognitive neuroscience – a hidden legacy of Alan Turing
 2011: Donald Knuth, An Evening with Donald Knuth – All Questions Answered
 2010: Christopher Bishop. Embracing Uncertainty: the new machine intelligence
 2009: Mike Brady, Information Engineering and its Future
 2008: James Martin, Target Earth and the meaning of the 21st century
 2007: Grady Booch, The Promise, the Limits and the Beauty of Software
 2006: Chris Mairs, Lifestyle access for the disabled 
 2005: Fred Brooks, Collaboration and Telecollaboration in Design
 2004: Fred Piper, Cyberspace Security, The Good, The Bad & The Ugly
 2003: Caroline Kovac, Computing in the Age of the Genome
 2002: Mark Welland, Smaller, faster, better – but is it nanotechnology?
 2001: Nick Donofrio, Technology, Innovation and the New Economy
 2000: Brian Randell, Facing up to Faults
 1999: Samson Abramsky From Computation to Interaction – Towards a Science of Information

References

1998 establishments in the United Kingdom
Recurring events established in 1998
Lecture series
Computer science education
Academic awards
British Computer Society
Institution of Engineering and Technology
Alan Turing